Harry Bateman Lunn (February 11, 1933 – September 22, 2016) was a halfback who played in the Canadian Football League from 1955 to 1960.

Lunn was discovered by Saskatchewan Roughriders coach Frank Filchock in 1954 playing for the Hamilton Panthers of the ORFU Intermediate league. He paid immediate dividends for his new team, winning the 1955 Dr. Beattie Martin Trophy for best Canadian rookie in the west on the strength of his 175 rushing yards and his league leading punt and kick off returns. His best season was 1957, with 326 rushing yards, and he intercepted 12 passes during his career. He also represented the West in the 1958 Shrine Game. He died in 2016 at the age of 83.

References

1933 births
Saskatchewan Roughriders players
Ottawa Rough Riders players
Hamilton Tiger-Cats players
2016 deaths
Canadian Football League Rookie of the Year Award winners
Ontario Rugby Football Union players